Bassira Touré (born 6 January 1990) is a Malian footballer, who plays as a forward for Fatih Karagümrük and the Mali women's national team.

Club career

Touré returned to Turkey again and joined the newly established  Istanbul clubFatih Karagümrük to play 2021-22 Turkcell Women's Super League.

International career
She played for Mali at the 2016 Africa Women Cup of Nations, scoring twice for Mali in the match against Kenya.

She scored for Mali in a 2018 Africa Women Cup of Nations qualification match against Ivory Coast.

References

External links
 

1990 births
Living people
Sportspeople from Bamako
Malian women's footballers
Women's association football forwards
Málaga CF Femenino players
F.C. Kiryat Gat (women) players
Fatih Karagümrük S.K. (women's football) players
Primera División (women) players
Ligat Nashim players
Turkish Women's Football Super League players
Mali women's international footballers
Malian expatriate  footballers
Malian expatriate sportspeople in Spain
Expatriate women's footballers in Spain
Malian expatriate sportspeople in Israel
Expatriate women's footballers in Israel
Malian expatriate sportspeople in Turkey
Expatriate women's footballers in Turkey
21st-century Malian people